Curses is an anthology of themed fantasy and science fiction short stories on the subject of curses edited by Isaac Asimov, Martin H. Greenberg and Charles G. Waugh as the eleventh volume in their Isaac Asimov's Magical Worlds of Fantasy series. It was first published in paperback by Signet/New American Library in September 1989.

The book collects seventeen novellas, novelettes and short stories by various fantasy and science fiction authors, with an introduction by Asimov.

Contents
"Introduction: Malevolence" (Isaac Asimov)
"The Curse" (Arthur C. Clarke)
"Julia Cahill's Curse" (George Moore)
"The Red Swimmer" (Robert Bloch)
"The Doom of the Griffiths" (Elizabeth Gaskell)
"You Know Willie" (Theodore R. Cogswell)
"Trouble with Water" (Horace L. Gold)
"Mad Monkton" (Wilkie Collins)
"Long Chromachy of the Crows" (Seumas MacManus)
"The Little Black Train" (Manly Wade Wellman)
"The Curse of the Catafalques" (F. Anstey)
"A Séance in Summer" (Mario Martin, Jr.)
"Transformations" (Christopher Fahy)
"In Dark New England Days" (Sarah Orne Jewett)
"The Messenger" (Robert W. Chambers)
"Or the Grasses Grow" (Avram Davidson)
"The Dollar" (Morgan Robertson)
"A Hunger in the Blood" (Talmage Powell)

Notes

1989 anthologies
Fantasy anthologies
Science fiction anthologies
Martin H. Greenberg anthologies
Signet Books books